John Joseph Bittenbinder (born September 1, 1943), known as J. J. Bittenbinder, is a retired member of the Chicago Police Department and author, who hosted the 1990s crime series Tough Target and is a public speaker on the subject of safety.

Biography
Bittenbinder was born September 1, 1943, in Buffalo, New York. He joined the Chicago Police Department in 1971, and remained with the force for 23 years; the last 18 were spent assigned to homicide and violent crimes.  He is considered to be an expert on violent crimes and tours the country, speaking to audiences about the topic. His 1997 book Tough Target: A Street-Smart Guide to Staying Safe was critically and financially successful.

In popular culture
In 1995, J. J. Bittenbinder became the host of the television program Tough Target, which focused on crimes and their prevention. He also wrote for the show. It was cancelled in 1996. He also has two of his own television specials on PBS, Street Smarts: How to Avoid Being a Victim and Street Smarts: Straight Talk for Kids, Teens & Parents. He has made guest appearances on many television shows, including The Oprah Winfrey Show and Primetime Live. He has also appeared on CNN and been the subject of national PBS television specials.

Bittenbinder was parodied in the cult favorite sketch comedy program Mr. Show. In the episode "Now Who Wants Ice Cream?", the comedian Bob Odenkirk portrayed F. F. Woodycooks, a bizarre, nasal-voiced host of a television show about crime, who was a parody of Bittenbinder. Woodycooks even has a strange mustache like Bittenbinder's and uses unusual and funny-sounding phrases to refer to criminals. Woodycooks hosts a show called Take Back the Streets in which he shows dramatizations of crimes. The sketch ends with Woodycooks promoting his "F. F. Woodycooks Ice Cream Parlour Precincts". Mr. Show writer Paul F. Tompkins states that he came up with the idea for the sketch after he heard Bittenbinder refer to a couple of rapists as "goofs".

Stand-up comedian John Mulaney references Bittenbinder's presentations to Mulaney's class at Saint Clement Catholic Elementary School in his Netflix comedy special John Mulaney: Kid Gorgeous at Radio City.

Street Smarts: Straight Talk for Kids, Teens & Parents was featured on an episode of Best of the Worst by American film and video production company, Red Letter Media.

Recent work
Currently, J. J. Bittenbinder is serving as Good Morning America Safety Specialist. He also has stated that he never wore a cowboy hat to school visits, contrary to what John Mulaney has said.

References

External links
 
 

Living people
American broadcast news analysts
American police detectives
American reporters and correspondents
American television journalists
American television talk show hosts
People from Chicago
Chicago Police Department officers
1943 births
American male journalists
Journalists from Illinois